Dolichodelphys is a monotypic genus of flowering plants in the family Rubiaceae. The genus contains only one species, Dolichodelphys chlorocrater, which is found in Venezuela, Colombia, Ecuador, and Peru.

References

External links 
 Dolichodelphys in the World Checklist of Rubiaceae

Monotypic Rubiaceae genera
Dialypetalantheae